Pyrenocollema is a genus of lichenized fungi in the biological division Ascomycota. Its relationship to other genera is unclear, and it has not been assigned to any family, order or class.

Species
Pyrenocollema elegans 
Pyrenocollema halodytes 
Pyrenocollema occidentalipamiricum 
Pyrenocollema orustense 
Pyrenocollema pelvetiae 
Pyrenocollema tichothecioides 
Pyrenocollema tremelloides

References

Xanthopyreniaceae
Lichen genera
Ascomycota genera
Taxa described in 1895